Chris Quigg (born December 15, 1944) is an American theoretical physicist at the Fermi National Accelerator Laboratory (Fermilab).  He graduated from Yale University in 1966 and received his Ph.D. in 1970 under the tutelage of J. D. Jackson at the University of California, Berkeley.  He has been an associate professor at the Institute for Theoretical Physics, State University of New York, Stony Brook, and was head of the Theoretical Physics Department at Fermilab from 1977 to 1987.

Contributions to physics
Quigg's contributions range over many topics in particle physics.  With Benjamin Lee and H. B. Thacker in 1977 he identified the uppermost theoretical mass scale for the Higgs boson.  In 1984 he coauthored "Supercollider Physics" (with Estia Eichten, Kenneth Lane and Ian Hinchliffe), which has strongly influenced the quest for future discoveries at hadron colliders, such as the Fermilab Tevatron, the SSC, and the LHC at CERN.  He is also author of Gauge Theories of the Strong, Weak, and Electromagnetic Interactions.

He has made many other significant contributions to the study of the spectroscopy of heavy-light mesons, signatures for the production of heavy quarks and quarkonium, and the study of ultrahigh-energy neutrino interactions.  He is an international lecturer and public speaker, and has been Editor of the Annual Review of Nuclear and Particle Science.

Awards and honors
Quigg was a recipient of the Alfred P. Sloan Foundation Research Fellowship, 1974–1978, and was elected a fellow of the American Physical Society in 1983. In 2011 Quigg with Estia Eichten, Ian Hinchliffe, and Kenneth Lane won the J. J. Sakurai Prize for Theoretical Particle Physics "For their work, separately and collectively, to chart a course of the exploration of TeV scale physics using multi-TeV hadron colliders"

Selected publications
 Gauge theory of the strong, weak and electromagnetic interactions. Benjamin Cummings 1983, Westview Press 1997, . 2nd edition, 2013
 with Jonathan L. Rosner: Quantum mechanics with application to Quarkonium. In: Physics Reports. vol. 56, 1979, pp. 167–235 
 Electroweak Theory. TASI Lectures, 2002 (PDF; 702 kB).
 Nature's greatest puzzles. SLAC Summer Institute 2004 (PDF; 224 kB).
 Visions- the coming revolutions of particle physics. 2002.
 Top-ology. (history of top-quark physics); shortened and revised version in:

References

External links

 Web site at Fermilab
 HEPNames profile: Chris Quigg

1944 births
Living people
21st-century American physicists
Yale University alumni
University of California, Berkeley alumni
Theoretical physicists
J. J. Sakurai Prize for Theoretical Particle Physics recipients
Fellows of the American Physical Society
People associated with Fermilab
Annual Reviews (publisher) editors